Eain Nee Chin is a 2015 Burmese comedy-drama television series. It aired on MRTV-4, from July 23 to October 14, 2015, on Mondays to Fridays at 19:20 for 60 episodes.

Cast
Kaung Myat San as Zarni Thway
Khay Sett Thwin as Eaindray Shin
Moe Di as U Nyat Si
San San Win as Daw Sein Toke
Pwint as Thay Thay Thwe
Wat Ma as U Tine Kyaw
Aye Aye Khine as Shwe Lone
Kyaw Htoo as U Yay Chan
Hsu Waddy as Mu Yar
Ayeyar as Oakkahta

References

Burmese television series
MRTV (TV network) original programming